Bishop Lucey Park is a public park located between Grand Parade and South Main Street in the centre of Cork in Ireland. It is one of few green spaces in the city centre and among the largest. It is often erroneously known as "The Peace Park" by locals, although this name actually refers to the area next to the River Lee at the junction of Grand Parade and South Mall where the National Monument, and the memorials to World War I and the Hiroshima and Nagasaki bombings are located.

History

The site of Bishop Lucey Park lies within the site of the original Hiberno-Norse settlement of Cork. A portion of the old city wall was excavated during the park construction and is visible near the Grand Parade entrance to the park.

For almost 800 years, the location of the park was a built environment, with a variety of commercial buildings, religious buildings and schools occupying portions of the site.

In 1970, Jennings department store burnt down leaving a substantial amount of the site derelict. It was decided to create a new park on the site in time for the celebrations of the 800th anniversary of Cork being granted a charter in 1985. The new park was named in honour of the recently deceased Bishop of Cork and Ross Cornelius Lucey.

In 2020, Cork City North East councillor Oliver Moran suggested that it may be appropriate to rename Bishop Lucey Park and certain other place names in the city in light of the publication of the Commission of Investigation into Mother and Baby Homes final report.

Usage
The park is used by city centre workers and residents, and is one of few examples of green spaces within Cork City Centre. It can be particularly crowded at lunch time when, if the weather permits, people take their lunch al fresco.

At winter time, the park hosts the Winter Wonderland, when it is illuminated with Christmas lights in conjunction with the Christmas Market that is held on Grand Parade.

In 2011 Christchurch Lane, which had been a pedestrian lane running along the northern edge of the park was incorporated into the park.

There are a number of art-works within the park. A copy of Seamus Murphy's sculpture "The Onion Seller" was donated by hosiery manufacturers Sunbeam Wolsey when the park opened.

Footnotes

References

Parks in Cork (city)